The Nes Power Station  is a hydroelectric power station located in the municipality Nes in Buskerud, Norway. The average annual production is 1,330 GWh. The station is operated by E-CO Vannkraft.

See also

References 

Hydroelectric power stations in Norway
Buildings and structures in Buskerud